Admiral Sir William de Leybourne, (abt. 1242-1310) was an English Knight and Military Commander.

Personal
William de Leybourne, first Lord Leybourne, was the eldest son of Roger de Leybourne from his marriage to Eleanor Ferrers. He married Juliana de Sandwich (1245-1327) on 16 October 1265; she was the daughter of Sir Henry de Sandwich. Juliana inherited all his estates and money in Kent. She was only four years old when her father died. William had three sons with Juliana, Thomas de Leybourne, Henry de Leybourne, John de Leybourne and three daughters, Idonea, Katherine and Joan. After his marriage William lived at his wife's manor of Preston-next-Wingham, Kent. In 1275 he was involved in a dispute with a Jewish moneylender, involving a large loan supposedly made to his father. In 1278 he decided to sell the manor and Leeds Castle to Queen Eleanor, who took over his financial debts, she cancelled all of the arrears that he inherited from his father, and payment for Castle Leeds. In the period leading up-to the death of his first son Thomas in 1307 he bequeathed him and his wife, Alice, who was the sister of Guy de Beauchamp, 10th Earl of Warwick, with the Manor of Leybourne. His second son, Henry, fought for the Earl of Lancaster at Battle of Boroughbridge, where he was taken prisoner and been outlawed. William de Leybourne died in 1310 leaving his grand daughter Juliana Leybourne (1303-1367) as his heir. Juliana Leybourne was to marry three times.

Career
Sir William de Leybourne served as a military commander under King Edward I of England and Edward II of England. In 1265, for his services during the Second Barons' War, he was given lands taken from Simon de Montforts rebels. In 1266 he was left in command of Sandwich by his father, and joined the Siege of Winchelsea. He then served in Wales in 1277, and in 1282 he was appointed Constable of Pevensey Castle. His first naval appointment came on 8 March 1287 when Edward I conferred on him the title of "Admirallus Maris Angliae," or "Admiral of the English Sea's" as Commander-in-Chief of the English Navy this was possibly the forerunner of the office of the Lord High Admiral of England. In 1294 he was appointed captain of the Kings Fleet gathered at Portsmouth styled as Admiral of the South the fleet was assembled to convoy Prince Edmund during the siege of Bayonne in Gascony, France.  In the same year he was also appointed Admiral of the West and Admiral of the Irish Sea he held both titles concurrently until 1306. In 1299 he also served in Scotland at the head of 5 knights and 59 esquires, and in 1300 he was in attendance at the Siege of Caerlaverock.

Offices held
 Constable of Pevensey Castle, 1282-1287.
 Admiral of the English Seas, 1286-1298.
 Admiral of the South, 1294-1306. 
 Admiral of the West, 1294-1306.
 Admiral of the Irish Sea, 1294-1306.

See also
 Admiral of the North
 Admiral of the West
 Admiral of England
 Admiral of the Fleet

References
Citations

Sources
 Brown, R.A.; Colvin, H.M.; Taylor, A.J. (1976). The History of the King's Works: The Middle Ages. H.M. Stationery Office.
 Everingham, Kimball G. ed. Plantagenet Ancestry: A Study In Colonial And Medieval Families, 2nd Edition. Douglas Richardson. .
 Everingham, Kimbal G. ed. (2011). Magna Carta Ancestry: Vol 3 (2 ed.). Douglas Richardson. .
 Hamilton, Sir Richard Vesey (1896). The Constitution, Character, and Functions of the Board of Admiralty, and of the Civil Departments It Directs. London: George Bell & Sons. .
 "History - A Royal Castle". www.leeds-castle.com. Leeds Castle Foundation, 2017. Retrieved 26 August 2017.
 Planché, James Robinson (1864). A Corner of Kent: Or, Some Account of the Parish of Ash-next-Sandwich, Its Historical Sites and Existing Antiquities. R. Hardwicke. The United Service Magazine. H. Colburn. England. 
  Houbraken, Jacobus; Thoyras, Paul de Rapin; Vertue, George (1747). The History of England, A List of Admirals of England, 1228-1745. J. and P. Knapton.
 Wurts, John S. (1945). Pedigrees of the Barons. Brookfield Publishing Company. Great Britain.

1242 births
1310 deaths
13th-century English people
13th-century English Navy personnel
14th-century English people
14th-century English Navy personnel
People of the Barons' Wars
English admirals
People from Tonbridge and Malling (district)
Military personnel from Kent